Purusiella hippomontanensis is a species of beetle in the family Cerambycidae. It was described by Dalens, Touroult and Tavakilian in 2010. It is known from French Guiana.

References

Hemilophini
Beetles described in 2010